Florence Scovel Shinn (September 24, 1871 in Camden, New Jersey – October 17, 1940) was an American artist and book illustrator who became a New Thought spiritual teacher and metaphysical writer in her middle years.

In New Thought circles, Shinn is best known for her first book, The Game of Life and How to Play It (1925). She  expressed her philosophy as:
The invisible forces are ever working for man who is always "pulling the strings" himself, though he does not know it. Owing to the vibratory power of words, whatever man voices, he begins to attract.--The Game of Life, Florence Scovel Shinn

Early life
Florence Scovel was born in Camden, New Jersey, the daughter of Alden Cortlandt Scovel and Emily Hopkinson Scovel. Her great, great, grandfather, Francis Hopkinson, signed the Declaration of Independence and is the earliest documented American composer of song. She was educated in Philadelphia where she attended the Pennsylvania Academy of the Fine Arts and there met her future husband, the artist Everett Shinn (1876–1953). After marriage they moved into a studio apartment at 112 Waverly Place, near Washington Square, New York. Everett built a theatre next door, and wrote three plays in which Florence played a leading role. They spent their summers in Plainfield (Cornish Art Colony), New Hampshire in a Colonial-style house designed by her husband. Florence and Everett divorced in 1912.

Illustrator
Florence worked as an illustrator in the early 1900s. She illustrated fiction in Harper's and other magazines, as well as popular novels such as Mrs. Wiggs of the Cabbage Patch (1901). The Society of Illustrators elected her to an Associate Membership in 1903, even though it did not admit women to full membership in the organization until 1922.

An early biographical sketch of Florence Scovel Shinn as an Illustrator offers insight into her later writings and attitude towards life:

Her keen sense of humor crops out in every group, and the turn of a line gives a comical effect. The peculiar gift that Mrs. Shinn is endowed with is that she can draw the most pitiful little figures and yet infuse into the picture a happy, healthy atmosphere that impresses us with the worth and joy of living. Her characters are never caricatures; they are appealing and provoke the laughter that bears no malice.

Writings and New Thought
Her metaphysical works began with her self-published The Game of Life and How to Play it in 1925. Your Word is Your Wand was published in  1928 and The Secret Door to Success in 1940. After her death another two works were published, The Power Of The Spoken Word in 1945 by Shinn Press and The Magic Path Of Intuition. This last book was published by Louise Hay in 2013 who received from a rare-books dealer a small, typewritten unpublished manuscript of the last writings of Florence Scovel Shinn, accompanied by a cover letter which said in part:

Several Months ago we came across a unique item from that collection that we think you may have an interest in. The item is an original typewritten manuscript by Florence Scovel Shinn, The Magic Path of Intuition. We're contacting you to see if you or Hay House have an interest in purchasing this rare original manuscript positioned to share its content with the world.

The Game of Life and How to Play it includes quotes from the Bible and anecdotal explanations of the author's understanding of God and man. Her philosophy centers on the power of positive thought and usually includes instructions for verbal or physical affirmation.

One example typical of Scovel Shinn's advice was:

It is safe to say that all sickness and unhappiness come from the violation of the law of love. A new commandment I give unto you, "Love one another," and in the Game of Life, love or good-will takes every trick.

Her advice is usually accompanied by a "real life" anecdote, as for the above "Love one another" advice:

A woman I know, had, for years an appearance of a terrible skin disease. The doctors told her it was incurable, and she was in despair. She was on the stage, and she feared she would soon have to give up her profession, and she had no other means of support. She, however, procured a good engagement, and on the opening night, made a great "hit". She received flattering notices from the critics, and was joyful and elated. The next day she received a notice of dismissal. A man in the cast had been jealous of her success and had caused her to be sent away. She felt hatred and resentment taking complete possession of her, and she cried out, "Oh God don't let me hate that man." That night she worked for hours "in the silence".

She said, "I soon came into a very deep silence. I seemed to be at peace with myself, with the man, and with the whole world. I continued this for two following nights, and on the third day I found I was healed completely of the skin disease!" In asking for love, or good will, she had fulfilled the law, ("for love is the fulfilling of the law") and the disease (which came from subconscious resentment) was wiped out.

Her books Your Word Is Your Wand and The Game of Life and How To Play It  were released as audiobooks in 2014 and 2015, respectively, with narration by actress Hillary Hawkins.

Shinn is considered part of the New Thought movement, as her writings follow in the tradition of Phineas Quimby (1802–1866), Mary Baker Eddy (1821–1910),  Emma Curtis Hopkins (1849–1925), and both Charles Fillmore (1854–1948) and Myrtle Fillmore (1845–1931), co-founders of the Unity Church.

Motivational author Louise Hay acknowledged her as an early influence.

Work
Published work during her life

Published work after her death

References

Bibliography
Butler-Bowdon, Tom  "The Secret Door To Success" by Florence Scovel Shinn - a commentary in 50 Success Classics: Winning Wisdom for Work and Life from 50 Landmark Books (2004) Nicholas Brealey Publishing, pp. 246–251.  Accessed May 2008.
Haanel, Charles F.  Master Key Arcana  Published 2004, Kallisti Publishing. Page 148. 
Rubinstein, Charlotte Streifer  American Women Artists: From Early Indian Times to the Present Published 1982 G.K. Hall 
John Cook, Steve Deger, Leslie Ann Gibson The Book of Positive Quotations Published 2007, Fairview Press . Contains 8 quotations by Florence Scovel Shinn.
Sheppard,  Alice (1984) There Were Ladies Present: American Women Cartoonists and Comic Artists in the Early Twentieth Century The Journal of American Culture 7 (3), 38–48   (pdf) Accessed May 2008

The Cornish Colony:   
Virginia Reed Colby, James B. Atkinson, Footprints of the Past, Images of Cornish, New Hampshire, and the Cornish Colony. New Hampshire Historical Society, Concord, New Hampshire, 1996.

External links

 The Game of Life and How To Play It Audiobook 
 Your Word Is Your Wand Audiobook
 
 
 
Selection of quotes from Shinn at Brainyquotes. Accessed May 2008.
Shinn's Secret Door To Success - a commentary from self-development scholar Tom Butler-Bowdon
Pennsylvania Academy of the Fine Arts students Group picture 1894 showing Florence Scovel standing. Archives of American Art, Smithsonian Institution, Washington. Accessed May 2008
Works of Florence Scovel Shinn at the Internet Sacred Text Archive

1871 births
1940 deaths
New Thought writers
American motivational writers
Women motivational writers
American self-help writers
American spiritual writers
American women illustrators
American illustrators
Writers from Camden, New Jersey
Artists from New Jersey